Karatoula or Karatoulas may refer to the following places in Greece:

Karatoulas, a village in the municipality Megalopoli, Arcadia
Karatoulas Kynourias, a village in the municipality North Kynouria, Arcadia
Karatoula, Elis, a village in the municipal unit Oleni, Elis 
Karatoula (mountain), a mountain in Gortynia in western Arcadia